Spring Run (also known as The Gut) is a tributary of the West Branch Susquehanna River in Northumberland County, Pennsylvania, in the United States. The stream is designated as an impaired waterbody due to sedimentation/siltation and unknown causes. The stream is classified as a Warmwater Fishery.

Course

Spring Run begins in a shallow valley in Delaware Township. It flows northwest for a few tenths of a mile before turning west-northwest for several tenths of a mile. The stream then heads in a west-southwesterly direction for several tenths of a mile, entering Watsontown. In Watsontown, it continues flowing west-southwest for several tenths of a mile, crossing a railroad. The stream then turns west for  a few tenths of a mile, reentering Delaware Township and crossing Pennsylvania Route 405. In then turns south-southwest for a short distance, reentering Watsontown and reaching its confluence with the West Branch Susquehanna River.

Hydrology
Spring Run is designated as an impaired waterbody. The causes of impairment are an unknown cause and sedimentation/siltation. The probable sources of impairment are agriculture and urban runoff/storm sewers.

Geography and geology

Watershed

The stream is entirely within the United States Geological Survey quadrangle of Milton. Its mouth is located at Watsontown.

The designated use for Spring Run is aquatic life. The stream is classified as a Warmwater Fishery.

History
Spring Run was entered into the Geographic Names Information System on August 2, 1979. Its identifier in the Geographic Names Information System is 1188261. The stream is also known as The Gut. This alternative name appears in various sources.

In 2015, Warrior Run Community Corp was issued a permit to construct a new pedestrian bridge over Spring Run for an existing walking trail. Moran Industries once applied for a permit to discharge stormwater into the stream during construction activities.

See also
White Deer Creek, next tributary of the West Branch Susquehanna River going downriver
Dry Run (West Branch Susquehanna River), next tributary of the West Branch Susquehanna River going upriver
List of rivers of Pennsylvania

References

Rivers of Northumberland County, Pennsylvania
Tributaries of the West Branch Susquehanna River
Rivers of Pennsylvania